Diaphus fulgens, is a species of lanternfish 
found in the Indo-Pacific.

Size

References

Myctophidae
Taxa named by August Brauer
Fish described in 1904